Baldet is a lunar impact crater that is located on the southern hemisphere on the far side of the Moon. It lies in the lava-flooded region between the craters Cori to the north, Stoney to the southwest, and the worn walled plain Minkowski to the southeast.

The rim of Baldet is low and worn, but generally retains its original circular shape. There is a slight outward bulge along the northwest rim, and the western interior wall is wider than elsewhere.

The flat, nearly featureless interior has been flooded by lava, and has a lower albedo than the surroundings giving is a darker hue. A smaller crater has broken into the eastern rim, leaving a gap where the two craters intersect that has been covered in lava. A similar-sized ghost crater lies just inside the northern rim, producing a raised ring in the crater surface. Another such formation lies just outside the southern rim of Baldet.

Satellite craters
By convention these features are identified on lunar maps by placing the letter on the side of the crater midpoint that is closest to Baldet.

References

 
 
 
 
 
 
 
 
 
 
 
 

Impact craters on the Moon